Diederick E. Grobbee (born 1957) is an epidemiologist and Distinguished University Professor at Utrecht University. Grobbee is one of the top highly-cited researchers (h>100) according to webometrics.

References 

Living people
Dutch epidemiologists
Academic staff of Utrecht University
1957 births